The 2015 season will be Minnesota United FC's sixth season of existence and their fifth consecutive season playing in the North American Soccer League, the second division of the American soccer pyramid.

Club

Transfers

Transfers In

Transfers Out

Loans In

Management 

  Nick Rogers – President
  Manny Lagos – Technical Director and Head Coach
  Carl Craig – Assistant Coach
  Donny Mark – Assistant Coach
  Paul O'Connor – Goalkeeping Coach
  Peter Rivard – Reserves Team Coach
  Craig Mallace – Director of Camps & Youth Development
  Dr. Corey Wulf – Team Doctor
  Dr. Brad Moser – Team Doctor
  Yoshiyuki Ono – Team Athletic Trainer
  David Bloomquist – Team Athletic Trainer

Friendlies

Competitions

NASL Spring Championship

Results summary

Results by round

Matches

NASL Fall Championship

Results summary

Results by round

Matches

NASL Playoffs

Semi-finals

U.S. Open Cup

Squad statistics

Appearances and goals

|-
|colspan="14"|Players who left Minnesota United during the season:

|}

Goal scorers

Disciplinary record

See also 

 Minnesota United FC
 2015 North American Soccer League season
 2015 in American soccer

References 

Minnesota United FC seasons
Minnesota United Football Club
Minnesota United Football Club
Minnesota United